Gubernatorial elections in 1995 took place in fifteen regions of the Russian Federation.

Background 
On 3 October 1994, the President of Russia Boris Yeltsin signed the Decree No. 1969 stating that elections for heads of administrations should be held only with the president's permission, until another procedure is established by federal law.

In August 1995, elections for the head of the administration of Sverdlovsk Oblast, unauthorized by the president, were held, and on December 17, in accordance with a presidential decree, elections were scheduled in 11 regions. In the same year, the president of Kalmykia was re-elected and the head of the Chechen Republic was elected.

Race summary

Kalmykia 
In October 1995 Kirsan Ilyumzhinov was re-elected as President of Kalmykia in early elections, running unopposed. This term (seven years) was the longest among the Russian governors. According to Ilyumzhinov himself, his competitors failed to collect signatures for registration, and Ilyumzhinov's administration decided not to find any nominal candidate, because he did not want to "fool the people".

Chechnya 

The 1995 elections for the head of Chechen Republic were held on December 17, simultaneously with the elections to the State Duma. Contrary to the laws of Russia, but according to the decision of the Supreme Council of the former Checheno-Ingushetia (which was restored as a temporary authority of Chechnya), every resident of Chechnya could vote wherever it suits them. The separatists staged a number of provocations. A few hours before the elections, a hospital in Gudermes was stormed by them. One of the schools in Grozny, where the polling station was located, was thrown by militants with grenades.

On December 6, the congress of the "Union of the People for the Revival of the Republic" was failed to held because of the government restrictions: delegates from the southern parts of Chechnya were stopped at checkpoints. The union was headed by the former chairman of the Supreme Soviet of Russia Ruslan Khasbulatov, considered Zavgayev's only real rival. For these reasons, on December 9, Khasbulatov withdrew from the elections.

According to official sources, 50.43% of Chechnya's residents took part in the voting. In addition, Russian military contingent stationed in Chechnya (about 40 thousand people) took part in the elections. The elections were monitored by 60 OSCE representatives, as well as 150 Russian and international observers, and no serious violations were identified. Other sources stating that OSCE representatives left Chechnya during the elections and none of the international observers attended the voting.

References

Gubernatorial elections in Russia
1995 elections in Russia